Bituminaria morisiana is a perennial Mediterranean herb species in the genus Bituminaria. Leaf, trifoliate with 3 linear, lanceolate, tomentose leaflets. White flowers in globose flowerheads. Fruit a tomentose legume. Flowers May–July. It is endemic to Sardinia where it is restricted to high mountain areas, such as Monte Albo and Monte Corrasi.

The pterocarpans bitucarpin A and B can be isolated from the aerial parts of B. morisiana, erybraedin C from the leaves and morisianine is isolated from the seeds.

See also
 Giardino Montano Linasia in San Benedetto, Iglesias, Province of Carbonia-Iglesias, Sardinia, Italy
 Fiori spontanei della Sardegna, Renato Brotzu, Quaderni di Natura Il Maestrale-Nuoro, 1998, Italia,

References

External links

 Bituminaria morisiana on www.ubio.org

Psoraleeae
Plants described in 1976